Saint Procopius of Sázava (died 25 March 1053) was a Czech canon and hermit, canonized as a saint of the Catholic church in 1204.

Life
Little about his life is known with certainty. According to hagiographical tradition, he was born in 970, in a Central Bohemian village of Chotouň near Kouřim. He studied in Prague and was ordained there.

He was married and had a son, called Jimram (Emmeram), but later entered the Benedictine order, presumably at Břevnov Monastery, and eventually retired to the wilderness as a hermit, living in a cave on the banks of Sázava River, where over time he attracted a group of fellow hermits.
The community of hermits was incorporated as a Benedictine monastery by the duke of Bohemia in 1032/3, now known as Sázava Monastery, or St Procopius Monastery, where he served as the first abbot for the span of twenty years until his death.

Veneration
Local veneration of Procopius as a saint is recorded for the 12th century when the first biography Vita minor has been written. He was canonized in 1204; however, there is still much debate on how his canonization was performed. It is stated that Pope Innocent III canonized him in 1204 or that during a liturgical elevation and translation of his body to the altar in Sázava his canonization took place. This was at that time the equivalent to canonization

After his canonization, he became greatly venerated throughout Bohemia, to the point of his being considered the national saint  of the Kingdom of Bohemia. His life and wonders were described by the Vita antiqua from the second half of the 13th century, and Vita maior from the 14th century. His remains were transferred to All Saints Church in Prague Castle in 1588.

The Cyrillic portion of the Reims Gospel manuscript (since 1554 kept in Reims, France) were attributed to Procopius in the 14th century, and Charles IV commissioned an extension of the manuscript in Glagolitic script in 1395.

Sázava Monastery had been destroyed in the Hussite Wars, but the church was re-established in the 17th century, as well as the monastery buildings changed in a castle. The Baroque-era frescos "The Meeting of Hermit Procopius with Prince Oldřich" and "Abbot Procopius Giving Alms" besides other frescos  depicting scenes the saint's life and the history of the monastery, were discovered there (under layers of 19th-century paint) in the 2000s.

Hugo Fabricius, a monk at Sázava, wrote a new life of St. Procopius in the 18th century, Požehnaná Památka Welikého Swěta Diwotworce Swatýho Prokopa ("The Blessed Legacy of the Great Miracle Worker of the World, St. Procopius").

Numerous churches in Bohemia are dedicated to him, and many Baroque-era statues and paintings of the saint are extant. Among these is the early 18th century Procopius statue on Charles Bridge by Ferdinand Brokoff. Modern retellings of the saint's life were published by Czech poets Jaroslav Vrchlický and Vítězslav Nezval.

The "Cave of St. Procopius", the supposed site of his original hermitage, was discovered by Method Klement OSB in the 1940s.

On 9 March 2017, by the decision of the Holy Synod of the Russian Orthodox Church, the name of "Venerable Procopius, Abbot of Sázava" was added to the Menologium of the Russian Orthodox Church.

References

Hugo Fabricius,  Požehnaná Památka Welikého Swěta Diwotworce Swatýho Prokopa,  Kutná Hora (1780).

External links

 Saints of July 14: Procopius of Sázava
 San Procopio di Sazava
History (klaster-sazava.cz)

Czech Roman Catholic saints
1053 deaths
Czech hermits
11th-century Christian saints
10th-century births